Michel Casella (born 15 February 1940) is an Argentine judoka. He competed in the men's heavyweight event at the 1964 Summer Olympics.

References

External links
 

1940 births
Living people
Argentine male judoka
Olympic judoka of Argentina
Judoka at the 1964 Summer Olympics
Place of birth missing (living people)